Club Sportiv Comunal Ghiroda & Giarmata Vii, commonly known as CSC Ghiroda, or simply as Ghiroda, is a Romanian football club based in Ghiroda, Timiș County. The club was established in 2010, under the name of ACS Ghiroda and knew recent important progress in the Romanian football league system, especially due to good economic situation of the commune, as part of the expansion of Timișoara metropolitan area.

History

First years and ascension (2010–present)
CSC Ghiroda was established in 2010, under the name of ACS Ghiroda and in the first ten years of activity had important progress in the Romanian football league system, especially due to good economic situation of the commune, as part of the expansion of Timișoara metropolitan area. Ghiroda was enrolled for the first time in the Liga V (fifth tier), in the summer of 2011, then at the end of the first season, "ghirodanii" were ranked 1st, with 15 points ahead the second place, FC Jebel, obtaining the promotion to Liga IV. In the next season, the team based near Timișoara was close to a second consecutive promotion, but finally it was ranked 2nd, after the second team of Nuova Mama Mia Becicherecu Mic.

2013–14 season brought a great performance for the young football club, which won the Timiș County series of the Liga IV, with only one point ahead Politehnica Timișoara, the most honoured football club in the Banat historical region and one of the traditional football clubs in Romania, which played in that season at the level of fourth tier due to 2012 bankruptcy of the club. As the champion of Timiș County, Ghiroda went to the promotion play-offs, but failed to make another step up, after a defeat on penalties, against Industria Galda (Alba County champion). Next two seasons, Ghiroda was ranked 3rd and missed any chance to promote to the third division, then at the end of the 2016–17 season, the club near Timișoara won Timiș Series of the fourth tier and the promotion play-offs, against Inter Petrila (Hunedoara County champion) and promoted to Liga III, for the first time in the recent history of the club.

At the end of the first season, "ghirodanii" ended 9th, out of 15 and saved from relegation, then in the summer of 2018, ACS Ghiroda was re-branded as CSC Ghiroda & Giarmata Vii, also changing the club colors from white and blue to yellow and blue. At the end of the 2018–19 season, the team was again in trouble, but avoided the relegation in the last round. After this season, followed another two with better results and the "yellow and blues" were ranked 8th and 5th, somehow stabilizing at this level.

Ground
CSC Ghiroda played its home matches on Emilian Pavel Stadium, in Ghiroda, Timiș County, a stadium with a capacity of only 200 seats, but with good conditions, including a floodlight system.

Honours
Liga III
Runners-up (1): 2021–22

Liga IV – Timiș County
Winners (2): 2013–14, 2016–17
Runners-up (1): 2012–13

Liga V – Timiș County
Winners (1): 2011–12

Cupa României – Timiș County
Winners (1): 2015–16
Runners-up (1): 2014–15

Players

First-team squad

Out on loan

Club officials

Board of directors

Current technical staff

League history

References

External links

Association football clubs established in 2010
Football clubs in Timiș County
Liga III clubs
Liga IV clubs
2010 establishments in Romania